Jump Britain is a 2005 documentary about freerunning.  Directed by Mike Christie and produced by Carbon Media, it is a sequel to Channel 4's Jump London. Two of the three freerunners from Jump London, Sébastien Foucan and Jérôme Ben Aoues, appear alongside the members of Urban freeflow, as they interact with landmarks all over Britain. Also, various members of Urban Freeflow go on a 'pilgrimage' to Lisses, France and visit Dame Du Lac there.

The freerunners tackle UK sites including Edinburgh Castle and the Forth Bridge in Scotland, the Giant's Causeway and Derry's walls in Northern Ireland, the Millennium Stadium in Cardiff, the Tyne Bridge in Newcastle and the International Convention Centre in Birmingham.

The original soundtrack was composed by Ian Masterson and Thomas Beach, and was released on iTunes, as well as appearing as an extra on the DVD release.

External links
 

Parkour in film
British sports documentary films